Claudia Dávila Moscoso is a Peruvian lawyer and politician. She was Minister of Women and Vulnerable Populations in the administration of Pedro Castillo from August until November 2022, succeeding Diana Miloslavich. She was replaced by Heidy Juárez Calle.

References

Year of birth missing (living people)
Living people
Women's ministers of Peru
Women government ministers of Peru
21st-century Peruvian politicians
21st-century Peruvian women politicians
21st-century Peruvian lawyers
21st-century women lawyers